1983 Dakar Rally also known as the 1983 Paris–Dakar Rally was the 5th running of the Dakar Rally event. The course crossed the Ténéré desert for the first time. A sandstorm led to 40 competitors becoming lost.

Mercedes won the car category with a 280 G, and the truck category with a 1936 AK, making them the only manufacturer in the history of the event to have won the race overall in two different categories.

Final standings

Cars

Bikes

References

Dakar Rally
Paris
Paris
1983 in African sport